Aero Sutan Aswar (born 4 December 1994) is an Indonesian male jet skier. His younger brother Aqsa Sutan Aswar is also a jet skier who competes for Indonesia in international arena. He claimed a silver medal in the men's runabout limited during the 2018 Asian Games while his younger brother Aqsa Sutan Aswar also claimed a bronze medal in the relevant event.

References 

1994 births
Living people
Indonesian jet skiers
Jet skiers at the 2018 Asian Games
Medalists at the 2018 Asian Games
Asian Games silver medalists for Indonesia
Asian Games medalists in jet skiing
21st-century Indonesian people